The double empathy problem is a psychological theory, coined in 2012 by autism researcher Damian Milton, which proposes that the social and communication difficulties present in autistic people when socialising with non-autistic people are actually due to a reciprocal lack of understanding and bidirectional differences in communication style, social-cognitive characteristics, and experiences between autistic people and non-autistic people, rather than an inherent deficiency as most autistic people are able to socialise, communicate, empathise well, and display good social reciprocity with each other.

Having the potential to radically shift how autism is seen and diagnosed, the theory of the double empathy problem fundamentally challenges both the common notion that the social skills of autistic people are inherently impaired, as well as the theory, developed by Professor Simon Baron-Cohen, that empathy and theory of mind (ToM) are generally impaired in autistic people, which is empirically questionable and has since been disputed due to many failed replications and mixed findings with many different operationalisations and measures. The double empathy problem has now been consistently supported by a substantial number of studies over the last few years.

History 
Early studies on autism regarding ToM and empathy concluded that lack of ToM was one of the primary symptoms of autism. The most popular of these studies were those by Simon Baron-Cohen in the 1980s and 1990s, who used the term "mind-blindness" to describe his theory, proposing a homogeneous explanation of autism as due to either a lack of ToM or developmental delay in ToM in early childhood. Mind-blindness implies an inability to predict behaviour and attribute mental states including beliefs, desires, emotions, or intentions of other people.

In the early 21st century, academics began to suggest that some studies of ToM tests may have misinterpreted autistic people having difficulty understanding neurotypicals as being an intrinsic social difficulty present in autistic individuals. The mind-blindness hypothesis, in addition to being questioned shortly after its publication, has been generally rejected by the scientific community, in response to the many failed replications of classic ToM studies and the growing body of evidence for the heterogeneity of autism. It seems more likely that autistic people are specifically having trouble understanding neurotypicals, due to the neurological differences between the two groups.

While the concept of double empathy had existed in prior publications, Damian Milton named and significantly expanded on it. Since 2015, there has been an increasing number of research studies, including experimental studies, qualitative research, and real-life social interaction studies supporting the double empathy theory and the findings appear consistent. However, the generalisability of these findings to younger autistic children and autistic people with an intellectual disability (ID) and/or speech-language impairment is unknown and will require further research as the literature is still relatively young. Bidirectional communication and socialisation studies so far have seemingly only included autistic people who are not nonverbal and do not have an ID.

In a podcast in December 2020 and later also in an article in May 2022, Baron-Cohen positively recognised the double empathy theory and recent findings that support it.

Neurologically-aligned studies 
Studies that have used autistic-autistic pairs to test interpersonal rapport and communication effectiveness in adults have shown that autistic adults perform better in interpersonal rapport and communication effectiveness when paired with other autistic adults, that higher rapport may be present in autistic-autistic interactions than in those between autistic and neurotypical people, and that autistic people may be able to understand and predict each other's thoughts and motivations better than neurotypicals as well as possibly autistic close family members.

Neurotypical individuals tend to have a poor understanding of autistic people, just as autistic people may have a poor understanding of non-autistic people. It is likely that autistic people understand non-autistic people to a higher degree than vice versa, due to the frequency of masking – i.e., diminishing one's autistic traits and/or personality to better camouflage into a non-autistic society. Masking begins at a young age in order to avoid bullying, a common experience for autistic children and adults. The bullying targeted at autistic people, along with the problem of ableism in autism research, further suggests that neurotypicals generally lack empathy towards autistic people, which further supports the double empathy theory.

Autistic ToM is typically based on the use of rules and logic and may be modulated by differences in thinking. If autistic people were inherently poor at social communication, an interaction between a pair of autistic people would logically be more of a struggle than one between an autistic and neurotypical person. This research contests common assumptions about autistic people in the fields of psychology and psychiatry.

A 2018 study has shown that autistic people are more prone to object personification, suggesting that autistic empathy may be not only more complex but also more all-encompassing, contrary to the popular belief that autistic people lack empathy.

Autistic perspectives 
Many autistic activists have shown support for the double empathy concept, and have argued that past studies done on ToM in autism have served to stigmatise autistic people, blame autistic-neurotypical misunderstandings solely on autistic people, and dehumanise autistic people by portraying them as unempathetic. This lack of understanding and resultant stigma and marginalisation felt by autistic people in social settings may negatively impact upon their mental health, employment, accessibility to education and services, and experiences with the criminal justice system.

Damian Milton has described the belief that autistic people lack ToM as a myth analogous to the now-discredited theory that vaccines cause autism. Emphasising that communication is two-sided, Milton proposes that further autism research should focus on bridging the "double-empathy gap" by empowering autistic individuals, building rapport and appreciation for their worldview, and moving towards a more continuous understanding of neurodiversity. It has also been suggested that the medical model of autism should be moved away from due to how its messaging could contribute to prejudice towards autistic people, further widening this double-empathy gap.

Further reading

See also 

 Neurodiversity
 Autism rights movement
 Controversies in autism
 Discrimination against autistic people
 Inclusion (disability rights)
 Medical model of disability
 Social model of disability

References 

Autism
Communication
Empathy
Interpersonal relationships
Psychological theories
Theory of mind